Local elections are scheduled to be held in the United Kingdom in May 2023. Elections in England are scheduled to be held on 4 May, with the Northern Irish election scheduled to be held on 18 May. These will include district councils, unitary authorities, and directly-elected mayors in England, and all local councils in Northern Ireland.

England

Background 
A majority of the seats up for election were last elected in May 2019. In those elections, the Conservative party lost over a thousand seats and control of several councils while the Liberal Democrats managed to make the most gains at their expense. The Labour party also lost seats in the 2019 local elections.

In the year prior to these elections in England, there were a large set of public sector strikes across the public sector, with high profile strikes in transport and the health service. There were also extensive strikes in the postal services, education sector and amongst the civil service. In mid-February, Conservative member of the House of Lords, Lord Hayward, said that the current strikes taking place in the public sector have popular support and so are damaging the government and party's chances in the local elections. He argued the strikes need to stop in order to improve their chances.

The Conservative party had been performing poorly in national polls leading up to these elections - they had been more than 20 points behind the Labour party in opinion polling. Conservative party chair Greg Hands MP publicly recognised that this election would be difficult for the party.

The Liberal Democrat party has been utilising recent comments from Conservative MPs as part of their advertising to draw attention to their undesirable and "toxic" opinions, such as their views on the death penalty. The Labour party has stated to the press that they want to use these local elections to prepare for the general election touted to take place.

Metropolitan boroughs 
There are thirty-six metropolitan boroughs, which are single-tier local authorities. Thirty-three of them elect a third of their councillors every year for three years, with no election in each fourth year. These councils hold their elections on the same timetable, which includes elections in 2023. Due to boundary changes, seven councils which generally elect their councillors in thirds, will elect all of their councillors in 2023. They will then return to the thirds schedule.

In 2021, the government appointed commissioners to oversee Liverpool City Council following an investigation into the mayor of Liverpool Joe Anderson. In 2022, the government announced it would take greater control of the council. Liverpool was required to move to all-out elections from 2023 under new boundaries following a report by the government commissioner Max Caller.

Wirral Council has also decided to move to all-out elections from 2023, on the existing ward boundaries.

Whole council

Third of council 
By-elections or uncontested wards can cause the seats up for election to be above or below one third of the council.

Unitary councils

Whole council

Third of council

District councils 
District councils are the lower tier of a two-tier system of local government, with several district councils covering the same area as a county council with different responsibilities.

Whole council

Third of council

Mayoral elections 

The voting system for mayoral elections will be first past the post - replacing the supplementary vote used for all previous mayoral elections.

Opinion polling 

Focaldata published a poll in February 2023 garnering voting intention for the local elections.

Northern Ireland

References
Footnotes

Citations

 
Local elections
Council elections in the United Kingdom